Ramon Llull may refer to:

 Ramon Llull, a Majorcan writer and philosopher born in 1232
 Ramon Llull Foundation, in Andorra la Vella
 Ramon Llull Institute, with headquarters shared between Barcelona and Palma de Mallorca
 Ramon Llull University, in Barcelona